Sébastien Chardonnet (born 17 October 1988) is a French rally driver. He made his WRC debut in 2012 Monte Carlo Rally in Renault Clio R3 with his co-driver Thibault de la Haye. Chardonnet scored his first championship point in 2012 Rallye de France by finishing tenth overall driving Citroën DS3 WRC.

Sébastien started his career in karting at the age of 11, promoting to single-seaters such as Formula Renault before switching to rallying, in 2009. His grandfather was André 'Doudou' Chardonnet, a former circuit racer and rally driver himself. André Chardonnet was also an established Lancia importer in France, who owned a very successful privateer rally team. Frenchman Bernard Darniche won Tour de Corse in 1979 and 1981 at the wheel of a Team Chardonnet entered Lancia Stratos, famously painted 'bleu de France'.

In 2011, Chardonnet was about to make his World Rally Championship debut driving Ford Fiesta R2 in WRC Academy that season. Eventually he had to withdraw from the series before the first rally, due to sponsorship difficulties.

In 2012, he made his first WRC appearance with a WRC car, at 2012 Rallye de France. He finished tenth overall with a Citroën DS3 WRC.

In 2013, he competed in the WRC-3 championship, driving a Citröen DS3 R3T supported by Citroën's official WRC team. He won the championship by a ten-point-margin to Keith Cronin. Chardonnet won two events in the season and finished three times in second place.

Career results

WRC results

WRC 3 results

WRC-2 Results

References

External links
 Official website
 Chardonnet at eWRC-results.com

1988 births
Living people
French rally drivers
World Rally Championship drivers